David Fulmer is an American author, journalist, and filmmaker.

Biography
Born Thurston David Fulmer, to Thurston (1924–2012) and Flora (née Prizzi) Fulmer (1925-2020) in Northumberland, Pennsylvania (pop 3,714). He is Sicilian on his mother's side and English, German, and Dutch on his father's. He worked as a reporter and photographer at local newspapers during and after high school. He was drafted into the U.S. Army in 1971 and became a photographer attached to IDHS Section of the USAREUR Intelligence Center in Heidelberg, Germany. On May 24, 1972, his location was bombed by the Baader-Meinhof Gang shortly after he left the his building and three of his co-workers were killed. From 1974-1979 he was married to Suzanne Mercier, a native of Sydney, Australia. After his discharge from the Army in 1974, they spent a year in State College, PA and a year in Lewisburg, PA before moving to Atlanta, Georgia. He worked as a bartender at Rose's Cantina (later known as the 688 Club) while attending Georgia State University. His daughter Italia Fulmer Kostrinsky was born in 1996 and is now an elementary arts teacher in Decatur, Georgia. In 2013, he married Sansanee Sermprungsuk, a research librarian. They reside in East Atlanta.

Career
As an author, Fulmer has written and published eleven novels and one novella since 2001, along with several short stories. As a journalist, he has written about music and other subjects for the Atlanta Journal-Constitution, Southline, Atlanta Magazine, City Life, Markee,  Georgia Music Magazine, Blues Access, Il Giornale, Goodlife, Advertising Age, The Atlanta Tribune, Creative Loafing, and BackStage.  He has also worked as a welder, a display fabricator, and a bartender.

Fulmer wrote and produced the documentary Blind Willie's Blues (1997), which Video Librarian called "nothing less than the economic, social, and historical evolution of America's indigenous music". He also wrote and produced the Americana audio series for National Public Radio (NPR) affiliate WABE-FM and WMLB-AM, both in Atlanta. He is the co-producer with Michael Reeves of "Piano Red – The Lost Atlanta Tapes", a CD collection by rock-and-roll legend Piano Red, released in August 2010 on Landslide Records. During his freelance career, he worked as a welder, a renovation carpenter, a set-builder, and a bartender. As a communications professional, he worked in the motorsports industry as Media Director for the Panoz Schools and Road Atlanta in Braselton, Georgia (1988–1999). From 2006 to 2020, he taught his "Fiction Shop" classes and workshops at various locations around the southeast. He is currently represented by literary agent Laura Langlie and dramatic-rights agent Mary Pender of the United Talent Agency.

Works
In 2001, Fulmer's first novel, Chasing the Devil's Tail, was released by Poisoned Pen Press. Harcourt Books purchased the paperback rights in 2003, and then contracted with Fulmer for five more novels. Two of Fulmer's novels won national literary awards: Chasing the Devil's Tail won the Shamus Award (2002) and Rampart Street won the Benjamin Franklin Award (2007). His novel The Blue Door was nominated for the 2009 Shamus Award for Best Novel. Fulmer's work has received high praise from such publications as Publishers Weekly, The New York Times, The Washington Post, USA Today, The Boston Globe, Atlanta Journal-Constitution, San Francisco Chronicle, Booklist, Library Journal, and Kirkus Reviews. 
Beginning in April, 2017. Crescent City Books began new releases of the entire Valentin St. Cyr series, beginning with "Chasing the Devil's Tail." "Eclipse Alley", his sixth Valentin St. Cyr mystery, was released by Crescent City Books in October, 2017 and "The Day Ends at Dawn," the seventh and final novel in the series in January, 2019. He is currently at work on his thirteenth novel with the working title "River Runs to the Sea." In July 2022, he released "Drowning on Dry Land," a podcast about his 2019 journey in and out of psychosis.

Novels
Chasing the Devil's Tail (Hardcover), Poisoned Pen Press, November 2001; A Valentin St. Cyr mystery.
Chasing the Devil's Tail (Trade paperback and ebook), Harcourt Books, June 2003; Japanese and Italian translations, September 2002. French translation, September 2008; Blackstone Audiobook, May 2007; A Valentin St. Cyr mystery.
Jass (Trade paperback and ebook), Harcourt Books, January 2005 (Trade paperback), January 2006; French translation May 2010; A Valentin St. Cyr mystery.
Rampart Street (Trade paperback and ebook), Harcourt Books, January 2006; (Trade paperback) January 2007; BBC America Audiobook, January 2006; French translation, October 2011; A Valentin St. Cyr mystery.
Chasing the Devil's Tail (Paperback) Crescent City Books, January 2017.
The Dying Crapshooter's Blues (Trade paperback and ebook), Harcourt Books, January 2007; (Trade paperback) January 2008; Recorded Books Audiobook.
The Blue Door (Hardcover), Harcourt Books, January 2008; (Trade paperback) January 2009; Turkish translation, May 2011. Ebook release, February 2016.
Lost River (Trade paperback and ebook), Harcourt Books, November 2008; A Valentin St. Cyr mystery.
The Night Before (Trade paperback and ebook), Bang Bang Lulu Editions, November 2012.Will You Meet Me in Heaven?? (Trade paperback and ebook), Bang Bang Lulu Editions, May, 2014.The Iron Angel (Trade paperback and ebook), Bang Bang Lulu Editions, March 2015. A Valentin St. Cyr mystery.Anthracite (Trade paperback and ebook), Bang Bang Lulu Editions, September 2015.Chasing the Devil's Tail (Paperback) Crescent City Books, January 2017. A Valentin St. Cyr mysteryJass (Paperback) Crescent City Books, February 2017. A Valentin St. Cyr mysteryRampart Street (Paperback) Crescent City Books, March 2017.A Valentin St. Cyr mysteryLost River (Paperback) Crescent City Books, May 2017. A Valentin St. Cyr mysteryThe Iron Angel (Paperback) Crescent City Books, July 2017. A Valentin St. Cyr mysteryEclipse Alley (Trade paperback) Crescent City Books February 2018. A Valentin St. Cyr mysteryThe Day Ends at Dawn (Paperback) Crescent City Books, January 2019. A Valentin St. Cyr mystery

Short fiction
"black cat bone", Blues Access, Spring 1997
"Back o' Town Blues", Flesh and Blood, 2003
"Algiers", New Orleans Noir, Akashic Books, April 2007

Magazines and newspapers
Since 1985, Fulmer has contributed to periodicals including the Atlanta Journal-Constitution, BackStage, Blues Access, City Life, Paste Magazine, The Atlanta Tribune, Southline, Atlanta Magazine, Creative Loafing, Advertising Age,Business Atlanta, Il Giornale and various trade publications.

AwardsChasing the Devil's TailWinner, AudioFile Earphones Award
Nominee, 2004 Falcon Award
Nominee Best Novel - Los Angeles Times Book Prize
Winner, Shamus Award for Best First Novel
Nominee,  Barry Award for Best Mystery
"Best New Series", Booklist"Hottest Beach Read" - Books Read LatelyJass2006 Georgia Author of the Year Award for Fiction
"Best of 2005 List" – Library Journal"Best of 2005 List" – The St. Louis Post-Dispatch"Best of 2005 List" – Deadly Pleasures MagazineRampart Street2007 Benjamin Franklin Award for Adult Fiction AudiobookNew York magazine "Best Novel You've Never Read"The Dying Crapshooter's Blues"Ice Pick of the Month" – Booklist, January 2007The Blue Door"2008 Best of the Shelf" – Atlanta'' magazine
Nomination for "2009 Shamus Award for Best Novel"

References

1950 births
Living people
Novelists from Pennsylvania
Shamus Award winners
People from Northumberland, Pennsylvania
American male journalists
American male novelists
21st-century American novelists
21st-century American male writers
21st-century American non-fiction writers